Saltmarshe railway station is a railway station on the Hull and Doncaster Branch between Goole and Gilberdyke stations. It serves the village of Laxton, East Riding of Yorkshire, England.

The station was opened in 1869 as part of the North Eastern Railway's Hull and Doncaster Branch.

Description
The station and all trains serving it are operated by Northern. There used to be a signal box at the west end of the platforms on the southern side of the line, which controlled the level crossing at the site. It was abolished and removed in the autumn of 2018 as part of signalling upgrade work in the area.

It is named after Saltmarshe, one mile south of the station, on the north bank of the River Ouse.

Facilities at the unstaffed station are basic, with no ticketing provision and no permanent buildings other than waiting shelters on each platform.  Train information can be obtained from timetable posters or by telephone. There is step-free access on each side, but the Hull-bound platform requires the use of a barrow crossing alongside the signal box. Mobility-impaired users are advised not to use it without assistance.

Services

The station is served by a limited number of trains between Hull and Doncaster. Currently 17 trains per day call. Northbound there are seven trains to Hull (the first northbound train in the morning continues to Scarborough via Beverley.

Southbound there are 10 trains to Doncaster (of which one continues to Sheffield and an early morning train continues to Adwick. Passengers for intermediate stations between Doncaster and Sheffield now have to change at Doncaster as the Hull to Sheffield stopping service has been cut into two after the December 2019 timetable change.

There is no Sunday service.

References

External links

Railway stations in the East Riding of Yorkshire
DfT Category F2 stations
Former North Eastern Railway (UK) stations
Railway stations in Great Britain opened in 1869
Northern franchise railway stations
1869 establishments in England